Benzoic anhydride is the organic compound with the formula (C6H5CO)2O.  It is acid anhydride of benzoic acid and the simplest symmetrical aromatic acid anhydride. It is a white solid.

Preparation and reactions
It is usually prepared by the dehydration reaction of benzoic acid, e.g. using acetic anhydride:
2 C6H5CO2H  + (CH3CO)2O  → (C6H5CO)2O  +  2 CH3CO2H
Alternatively, sodium benzoate can be treated with benzoyl chloride. It can be produced by dehydrating benzoic acid by heating.   

Benzoic anhydride provides a convenient way to prepare benzoic esters:
(C6H5CO)2O  +  ROH  →  C6H5CO2H  +  C6H5CO2R

References

Carboxylic anhydrides